Aziz al-Soltan (1879–1940) was a favorite of Naser al-Din Shah Qajar of Iran (r. 1848–1896).

He was a nephew of one of the shah's favorite wives, Amina Aqdas. He was introduced to court where he became a page and swiftly a favorite of the shah, a position supported by his aunt. The shah spent a fortune on him, who was commonly known as Malijak, and his favorite position and the privileges and money spent on him attracted much negative publicity and made him disliked by many circles at court.

References

Further reading
 

19th-century Iranian people
1940 deaths
1879 births
Royal favourites
Qajar courtiers